Vergennes Township is one of sixteen townships in Jackson County, Illinois, USA.  As of the 2010 census, its population was 771 and it contained 324 housing units.

Geography

Cities, towns, villages
 Vergennes

Unincorporated towns
 Grubbs at 
(This list is based on USGS data and may include former settlements.)

Adjacent townships
 Elk Township (east)
 DeSoto Township (southeast)
 Somerset Township (south)
 Levan Township (southwest)
 Ora Township (west)

Cemeteries
The township contains these two cemeteries: Parrish and Tuthill.

Major highways
  Illinois Route 4
  Illinois Route 13

Demographics

School districts
 Elverado Community Unit School District 196

Political districts
 Illinois' 12th congressional district
 State House District 115
 State Senate District 58

References
 
 United States Census Bureau 2007 TIGER/Line Shapefiles
 United States National Atlas

External links
 City-Data.com
 Illinois State Archives

Townships in Jackson County, Illinois
Townships in Illinois